The XXII Corps of the Ottoman Empire (Turkish: 22 nci Kolordu or Yirmi İkinci Kolordu) was one of the corps of the Ottoman Army. It was formed during World War I.

Formations

Order of Battle, August 1917 
In August 1917, the corps was structured as follows:

XXII Corps (Palestine)
3rd Division, 7th Division, 53rd Division

Order of Battle, January 1918, June 1918 
In January and June 1918, the corps was structured as follows:

XXII Corps (Palestine)
3rd Division, 7th Division, 20th Division

Order of Battle, September 1918 
In September 1918, the corps was structured as follows:

XXII Corps (Palestine)
7th Division, 20th Division

Sources

Corps of the Ottoman Empire
Military units and formations of the Ottoman Empire in World War I